Two-time defending champion Novak Djokovic defeated Kei Nishikori in the final, 6–3 6–3 to win the men's singles tennis title at the 2016 Miami Open. Djokovic completed his record fourth Sunshine Double with the win, and won his record-equaling sixth Miami Open title. He did not lose a single set in the entire tournament.

Seeds
All seeds receive a bye into the second round.

Draw

Finals

Top half

Section 1

Section 2

Section 3

Section 4

Bottom half

Section 5

Section 6

Section 7

Section 8

Qualifying

Seeds

Qualifiers

Lucky losers

Qualifying draw

First qualifier

Second qualifier

Third qualifier

Fourth qualifier

Fifth qualifier

Sixth qualifier

Seventh qualifier

Eighth qualifier

Ninth qualifier

Tenth qualifier

Eleventh qualifier

Twelfth qualifier

External links
Main Draw
Qualifying Draw

Men's Singles
2016 Miami Open – Men's singles